CDAA may refer to:
 Cave Divers Association of Australia Inc. - an association that represents Australian recreational cave divers.
 Circularly Disposed Antenna Array - a large circular antenna used by the military